Arvind Kumar may refer to:

 Arvind Kumar (academic) (born 1943), Indian physicist and educationist
 Arvind Kumar (surgeon) (born 1958), Indian surgeon
 Arvind Kumar (civil servant), IPS officer
 Arvind Kumar (lexicographer), Indian lexicographer and journalist